Lou Filippo (December 1, 1925 - November 2, 2009) was a professional boxer and later boxing judge.

Filippo was born on December 1, 1925 in Los Angeles, California, attended Fremont High School in South Los Angeles, and served in the Navy during World War II.

He fought more than 250 amateur fights and his professional record as a lightweight was 28 wins, 9 losses and 3 draws, with 8 knockouts.  He retired in 1957.

Filippo later became a referee and judge, including judging 85 world championship fights, most famously being the judge that had Marvelous Marvin Hagler the winner over Sugar Ray Leonard in April 1987 in a fight that Leonard won by split decision.  He continued to judge until his death. He played a referee in the first five Rocky films.  He also had small roles in a number of other films.

He was inducted into the World Boxing Hall of Fame and elected as its President in 1993. In 1997, Filippo was honored by the Cauliflower Alley Club.

Filippo died in Los Angeles, at age 83, after suffering a stroke.

Filmography

References

External links

1925 births
2009 deaths
Boxers from Los Angeles
American male boxers
Lightweight boxers